Atal Nagar Vikas Pradhikaran (ANVP) is the urban planning agency serving Atal Nagar Metropolitan Region of  the Indian state of Chhattisgarh. It was established under the Chhattisgarh Nagar Tatha Gram Nivesh Adhiniyam, 1973. The headquarters of the authority is 7, Utility Block, Capitol Complex, Sector- 19, Atal Nagar.

Departments
The authority is divided into the twelve departments.
 Engineering
 Finance
 Town planning
 Architecture
 Legal
 Monitoring
 Enforcement
 Vigilance
 Establishment and Authority
 Policy
 Land acquisition
 Information technology

See also
 Urban planning

References

External links
 Official website

Naya Raipur
State urban development authorities of India
State agencies of Chhattisgarh
Memorials to Atal Bihari Vajpayee
Government agencies established in 1973
1973 establishments in Madhya Pradesh